Arlene Pieper (18 March 1930 – 11 February 2021) became the first woman to officially finish a marathon in the United States when she finished the Pikes Peak Marathon in Manitou Springs, Colorado, in 1959. (Although known as Arlene Pieper at the time, she was born Arlene Val Richter and most recently before her death known as Arlene Pieper Stine.) Her daughter Kathie, 9, also ran in 1959 and became the youngest competitor as of 1959 to finish the half marathon race to the summit, but did not finish the whole marathon. Arlene also entered the Pikes Peak Marathon in 1958 but stopped at the summit, therefore being disqualified. In 1959, women had the choice of a race to the summit or the full marathon up to the summit and down. That year Katherine Heard was first to the summit with a time of 5:17:52 but did not run down the mountain. Arlene reached the summit four minutes later, and finished the marathon with a time of 9:16.

She did the marathon to promote a gym she and her husband owned in Colorado Springs, called Arlene's Health Studio. She trained for a year, wearing tennis shoes she bought from a dime store. She had three children at the time. After spending four years in Colorado, she and her husband returned to California, where she had lived as a teenager and where they had run gyms for exercise guru Harold Zinkin. They were also acquainted with exercise guru Jack LaLanne and Arnold Schwarzenegger. After they returned to California they ran another gym for Zinkin.

Arlene was unaware of the groundbreaking nature of her marathon until she was contacted by a historian in 2009. She served as the official starter for the Pikes Peak Marathon that year, and hung the Pikes Peak Marathon medal around the neck of the 2009 women's winner, who credited her win to Arlene's inspiration. Afterward Arlene attended the Pikes Peak Marathon every year until at least 2013 as part of the ceremonies.

Arlene died on February 11, 2021, at age 90.

Marriages 
Arlene was married to Wallen Pieper, Eddie Garza, and Richard Stine, with all of those marriages ending in divorce.

Honors
Arlene was named as one of the 2014 Heroes of Running by Runner's World.

In 2016, Arlene was inducted into the Colorado Springs Sports Hall of Fame.

In 2019, a group of women honored Arlene a week before the Pikes Peak Marathon by running up Pikes Peak while wearing white shorts, white hats and white shirts, which was the same outfit Arlene wore when she ran the marathon in 1959.

References

External links
Arlene’s website

21st-century American women
1930 births
2021 deaths
American female long-distance runners
American female marathon runners
Trail runners